Shea Backus (born 1975) is an American politician and attorney serving as a member of the Nevada Assembly from the 37th district.

Early life
Backus was born in 1975 in Las Vegas, Nevada, a third generation Nevadan. After graduating from Ed W. Clark High School in 1993, Backus earned a B.S. in management science from the University of California, San Diego in 1998 and both a Juris Doctor and Indian Law Certificate from the Sandra Day O'Connor College of Law at Arizona State University in 2003.

Career
Backus has been a member of the State Bar of Nevada since 2003. In 2018, Backus was elected to the Nevada Assembly, representing the 37th district.

Personal life
Backus is married to Marc McDermont.

References

Living people
1975 births
Politicians from Las Vegas
University of California, San Diego alumni
Sandra Day O'Connor College of Law alumni
Democratic Party members of the Nevada Assembly
Nevada lawyers
Women state legislators in Nevada
21st-century American politicians
21st-century American women politicians
21st-century American lawyers
21st-century American women lawyers